Raped in Their Own Blood is the first album by Swedish death metal band Vomitory. It was released in 1996 on Metal Blade.

Track listing
 "Nervegasclouds" – 5:19
 "Raped in Their Own Blood" – 3:22
 "Dark Grey Epoch" – 3:15
 "Pure Death" – 3:11
 "Through Sepulchral Shadows" – 4:56
 "Inferno" – 2:44
 "Sad Fog over Sinister Runes" – 4:50
 "Into Winter Through Sorrow" – 4:22
 "Perdition" – 2:50
 "Thorns" – 5:41

Personnel
 Ronnie Olson – vocals
 Thomas Bergqvist – bass guitar, backing vocals
 Tobias Gustafsson – drums
 Ulf Dalegren – guitar
 Urban Gustafsson – guitar
Daniel "Zakk Wylde" Engström – guitar solo ("Pure Death")
Vomitory – production
Living Skull – production
Volcanic Wolf – cover art
H.P. Skoglund – photography

References 

1996 debut albums
Vomitory (band) albums
Metal Blade Records albums